is a private Christian girls' junior and senior high school in , Chuo-ku, Osaka.

Missionaries from the Cumberland Presbyterian Church in the United States established the school in 1884.  it had a total of 1,330 students; its junior high division had 512 students and its senior high division had 818 students.

Notable alumna
Keiko Kitagawa, actress
Kumiko Sato, figure skater
Noriko Oda, figure skater
Hiromi Kobayashi, synchronized swimmer
Kim Chae-hwa, Zainichi Korean figure skater
Midori Naka, stage actress

References

External links
 Osaka Jogakuin Junior and Senior High School 
 English information

Christian schools in Japan
Girls' schools in Japan
Schools in Osaka
High schools in Osaka Prefecture
1884 establishments in Japan
Educational institutions established in 1884
Private schools in Japan